Laks may refer to:

 Laks (Caucasus), an ethnic group of Dagestan, North Caucasus, Russia
 Lak (tribe), a Kurdish tribe in southwestern Iran
 Simon Laks (1901-1983), Polish composer and violinist who became head of the prisoners' orchestra at Birkenau-Auschwitz concentration camp

See also 
 Lacs (disambiguation)
 Lachs, a surname
 Lak (disambiguation)
 Lakh, a unit in the Indian numbering system
 LAX (disambiguation)